Al-Sarī al-Raffā or Abul-Hasan al-Sari ibn Ahmed ibn al-Sari al-Kindi al-Raffa al-Mausili (died 362 AH/973 CE) was a poet in the court of Sayf al-Dawla, noted for his riddles and ekphrastic poetry. He compiled the anthology al-Muḥibb wa-l-maḥbūb wa-l-mashmūm wa-l-mashrūb, an extensive collection of 'verses about love, fragrant plants, and wine'.

Sample poem

One of al-Sarī's riddles runs as follows:

A‘dadtu li-’l-layli idha ’l-laylu ghasaq, / wa-qayyada ’l-alḥāẓa min dūni ’l-ṭuruq,
Quḍbāna tibrin ‘ariyat ‘ani ’l-waraq / shifā’uhā in maruḍat ḍarbu ’l-‘unuq.

I prepared for the night (when it darkened and fettered the eyes, obscuring the roads)
Leaveless twigs of gold which, should they wilt, may be reanimated by cutting their necks.

The answer is 'candles'.

Editions
  al-Sari al-Raffāʾ, Diwān al-Sari al-Raffāʾ, ed. by Ḥabīb Ḥusayn al-Ḥasani, 2 vols. (Baghdad: Manshūrāt Wizārat al-Thaqāfah wal A‘lām, 1981).
 al-Sari b. Aḥmad al-Raffāʾ, al-Muḥibb wa-l-maḥbūb wa-l-mashmūm wa-l-mashrūb, ed. Miṣbāḥ Ghalawinjī (vols 1-3) and Majīd Ḥasan al-Dhahabī (vol. 4), 4 vols (Damascus: Maṭbū‘āt Majma‘ al-Lughah al-‘Arabiyyah bi-Dimashq 1986–7).

Further reading
 Jocelyn Sharlet, 'Inside and outside the Pleasure Scene in Poetry about Locations by al-Sarī al-Raffā˒ al-Mawṣilī', Journal of Arabic Literature, 40 (2009), 133-69
 Jocelyn Sharlet, 'The Thought That Counts: Gift Exchange Poetry by Kushājim, al-Ṣanawbarī and al-Sarī al-Raffā’', Middle Eastern Literatures, 14 (2011), 235-70,

References

10th-century Arabs
10th-century Arabic poets
973 deaths
Year of birth unknown